Polish Academy Award for Best Film is one of the awards given to the best Polish motion picture.

Winners and nominees

References

External links
 Polish Film Awards at Internet Movie Database
 Polish Film Awards; official website

Awards for best film
Polish film awards
Awards established in 1999